Anisus leucostoma is a European species of small air-breathing freshwater snail, an aquatic pulmonate gastropod in the family Planorbidae, the ram's horn snails and their allies.

Taxonomy
Glöer (2002) considered Anisus septemgyratus (Rossmässler, 1835) as a junior synonym of Anisus leucostoma (Millet, 1813). Later Glöer & Meier-Brook (2008) used name Anisus septemgyratus again.

Anisus leucostoma may be a narrow-whorled morphotype of Anisus spirorbis.

Shell description 
The shell of this species is about 8 mm in maximum dimension, usually planispiral and tightly coiled, with a white rib in the aperture.

Distribution 
This species occurs in countries and islands including:
 Czech Republic – near threatened (NT)
 Slovakia
 Germany
 British Isles: Great Britain, Ireland

References

External links

 Anisus leucostoma at Animalbase

Planorbidae
Gastropods described in 1813
Taxa named by Pierre-Aimé Millet